Rose Schwarz (23 January 1935 – 15 October 2017) was a nurse and missionary who did work with the Reformed Church in Africa.

References 

1935 births
2017 deaths
Recipients of the Cross of the Order of Merit of the Federal Republic of Germany
Deaconesses
German women nurses
German nurses
People from Vaihingen an der Enz